Boston University Wheelock College of Education & Human Development is the school of education within Boston University.  It is located on the University's Charles River Campus in Boston, Massachusetts in the former Lahey Clinic building. BU Wheelock has more than 31,000 alumni, 65 full-time faculty and both undergraduate and graduate students. Boston University School of Education was ranked 34th in the nation in 2018 by U.S. News & World Report in their rankings of graduate schools of education. The School of Education is a member institution of the American Association of Colleges for Teacher Education (AACTE).

History
Boston University School of Education was founded in 1918 by Dr. Arthur H. Wilde, who served as the first dean of the school.

The School of Education houses the oldest continuously published journal in the field of education in the country, the Journal of Education. The Journal of Education was founded in 1875 from the merger of five New England education journals. In 1953, the Boston University School of Education took over publication of the journal, converting it to a student-run review in 1972 and then to a peer-reviewed academic journal in 2009.

Programs of study
Boston University School of Education offer only a Bachelor of Science undergraduate degree in Education and Human Development. However, for undergrads, there are five unique pathways to choose from:

   Child & Adolescent Mental Health

   Deaf Studies

   Educational Design for Transformative Social Futures

   Teaching & Learning

   Youth Development & Justice

They also offer graduate degrees through the Master of Education degree, the Master of Arts in Teaching degree, the Certificate of Advanced Graduate Study, and the Doctor of Education degree. Graduate programs include degrees in Educational Leadership and Curriculum and Teaching. Boston University's special education program offers a dual-degree program with the School of Social Work that results in students earning either an M.S.W./Ed.M. or an M.S.W./Ed.D.

Master's degree and C.A.G.S. programs usually require the equivalent of one year of full-time study. Doctoral programs generally require the equivalent of two or more years of full-time study.

Research facilities
The Early Childhood Learning Laboratory (ECLL) is a preschool affiliated with and located at the School of Education. It is a laboratory and demonstration school available to Boston University students, parents of children in the program, and other early childhood professionals for observing children and teachers.

Other programs
In 1997, Boston University created Boston University’s Initiative for Literacy Development (BUILD). BUILD is a collaboration between Boston University and the Boston Public Schools (BPS) that pairs BU students with BPS students from preschool to fifth grade and helps them develop their reading and writing skills.

In 1988, Boston University took over management of the public schools in Chelsea. The partnership was ended in June 2008.

In 2006, Step UP was created. Step Up is a collaboration between the BPS and the City of Boston to help students improve their performance. Boston University is one of five universities involved in the program.

The school partners with Jumpstart, an AmeriCorps program that recruits college students to mentor 3- to 5-year-old children.

Notable faculty
 Hardin L.K. Coleman, Dean of the School of Education at Boston University from 2008 to 2017.
 Henry Giroux, former professor of education at Boston University from 1977 to 1983. One of the founding theorists of critical pedagogy in the United States.
 James Paul Gee, former professor of education from 1982–1988 and chair of the Department of Developmental Studies and Counseling. His research focus is in psycholinguistics, discourse analysis, sociolinguistics, bilingual education, and literacy.

Notable alumni
 Wendy Chamberlin, SED'71, former U.S. Ambassador to the Islamic Republic of Pakistan, currently President of the Middle East Institute
 Marie Jean Philip, American Sign Language and Deaf Culture advocate, researcher and teacher. She was a pioneer in the Bilingual-Bicultural (Bi-Bi) movement
 Ben Bahan, American Sign Language storyteller and researcher

References

External links
 

School of Education
Schools of education in Massachusetts
Educational institutions established in 1918
1918 establishments in Massachusetts